The Fluffy Movie is a 2014 American stand-up comedy film directed by Manny Rodriguez and starring Gabriel Iglesias. The film was released in theaters on July 25, 2014, by Open Road Films. The concert movie was filmed at two shows on February 28, 2014, and March 1, in San Jose, California at the SAP Center.

Cast
Though the movie centers around Gabriel Iglesias in his stand-up shows, it shows several people in flashbacks who are portrayed by actors.
Gabriel Iglesias
Jacqueline Obradors as Esther P. Mendez
Jeremy Ray Valdez as Jesús Iglesias
Julio César Chávez Jr. as Young Gabe
Gina Brillon as Carmen
Ron White as Doctor
Ray William Johnson as Nurse
Tommy Chong as Video Store Clerk
Eddie "Piolín" Sotelo as Emcee

Additionally, DJ Chuy Gomez and Martin Moreno, both close friends of Iglesias, cameo in the film as themselves close to the beginning of the film.

Production
On February 13, 2014, it was announced that the film would be released on July 11, 2014, with Open Road Films distributing the film. The concert movie was filmed at two shows on February 28, 2014, and March 1, in San Jose, California.

Release
On July 25, 2014, the film received a limited release at 432 theaters in the United States.

Critical response
Upon its release, The Fluffy Movie was met with mixed reviews. The review aggregator website Rotten Tomatoes reported a 57% approval rating with an average rating of 5.4/10 based on 14 reviews. On Metacritic, the film achieved an average score of 56 out of 100 based on 11 reviews, signifying "mixed or average reviews".

Frank Scheck of The Hollywood Reporter gave a positive review of the film, remarking that Iglesias "delivers a solid set of often highly personal material that’s consistently amusing even if it never quite hits the level of hilarity". He further noted that Iglesias "is a likeable presence, and his fluid delivery, complete with spot-on accents and sound effects, is consistently engaging." Conversely, Kyle Anderson of Entertainment Weekly gave the film a C and said, "While Iglesias is perfectly competent as a comedian, he lacks the ability to really wrap his arms around his own personal narrative." Mark Jenkins of The Washington Post gave the film two-and-a-half stars, writing that the film's "principal weakness is that it’s not much of a movie". However, Jenkins went on to note that "The balance between the hilarious and the heartwarming is carefully maintained."

Box office
In North America, the film opened to number 17 in its first weekend, with $1,311,446.

References

External links
 
 
 
 

2014 films
American comedy films
Stand-up comedy concert films
2014 comedy films
Gulfstream Pictures films
Open Road Films films
2010s English-language films
2010s American films